Boy oh Boy is a pop song by the British pop group Racey. The song was written by Glo Macari and Roger Ferris, produced by Mickie Most and released 1979 on the RAK Records label. It reached #2 in South Africa, spending 19 weeks on the top 20.

Charts

Weekly Charts

Year-end charts

Certifications

References

1979 songs
Racey songs
RAK Records singles
Song recordings produced by Mickie Most
Songs written by Roger Ferris